The FIS Nordic World Ski Championships 1929 took place February 5–9, 1929 in Zakopane, Poland.

Men's cross country

17 km 
February 7, 1929

50 km 
February 9, 1929

Men's Nordic combined

Individual 
February 5, 1929

Men's ski jumping

Individual large hill 
February 5, 1929

Medal table

References
FIS 1929 Cross country results
FIS 1929 Nordic combined results
FIS 1929 Ski jumping results
Results from German Wikipedia
Hansen, Hermann & Sveen, Knut. (1996) VM på ski '97. Alt om ski-VM 1925-1997 Trondheim: Addresseavisens Forlag. p. 39. . 

FIS Nordic World Ski Championships
1929 in Nordic combined
Nordic skiing
Sports competitions in Zakopane
1929 in Polish sport
February 1929 sports events
Nordic skiing competitions in Poland